is a railway station on the Joban Line in Katsushika, Tokyo, Japan, operated by East Japan Railway Company (JR East).

Lines
The station is served by the Joban Line.

Station layout
The station has an island platform with two tracks for local services. Tracks for non-stop (rapid) trains run parallel to the local tracks but are not served by platforms at this station.

Platforms

History
The station opened on 17 May 1897.

Passenger statistics
In fiscal 2015, the station was used by an average of 41,058 passengers daily (boarding passengers only).

Surrounding area
The koban located at the north entrance of the train station is known as a model of a koban in Osamu Akimoto's long-running manga Kochira Katsushika-ku Kameari Kōen-mae Hashutsujo. The police cartoon stages in Kameari area where the train station is situated. As a tribute to the cartoon, two statues of the officer Kankichi Ryotsu, the main character of the series, were placed near north and south entrances of the train station in 2006.  Other statues of Kochi-Kame characters can be spotted in the surrounding area including Kameari Koen and are common photo spots for tourists.

See also
 List of railway stations in Japan

References

External links

 Kameari Station (JR East) 

Railway stations in Tokyo
Jōban Line
Stations of East Japan Railway Company
Railway stations in Japan opened in 1897